Tracy is a Canadian village in Sunbury County, New Brunswick at Route 101 and the eastern terminus of Route 645.

The village is situated on the North Oromocto River, approximately 40 km south of Fredericton.

History

Demographics 

Notable people

See also
List of communities in New Brunswick

References

Communities in Sunbury County, New Brunswick
Villages in New Brunswick